United Nations Security Council resolution 1300, adopted unanimously on 31 May 2000, after considering a report by the Secretary-General Kofi Annan regarding the United Nations Disengagement Observer Force (UNDOF), the Council extended its mandate for a further six months until 30 November 2000.

The resolution called upon the parties concerned to immediately implement Resolution 338 (1973) and requested that the Secretary-General submit a report on the situation at the end of that period.

The Secretary-General's report pursuant to the previous resolution on UNDOF said that the situation between Israel and Syria had remained calm with no serious incidents though the situation in the Middle East as a whole remained dangerous until a settlement could be reached. The Force had co-operated with the International Committee of the Red Cross with mail facilities and safe passage for persons through the separation zone; minefields in the zone continued to be a concern.

See also
 Arab–Israeli conflict
 Golan Heights
 Israel–Syria relations
 List of United Nations Security Council Resolutions 1201 to 1300 (1998–2000)

References

External links
 
Text of the Resolution at undocs.org

 1300
 1300
 1300
2000 in Israel
2000 in Syria
May 2000 events